Rock Creek is a southwest flowing stream in Madison and St. Francois counties in the U.S. state of Missouri. It is a tributary of the Little Saint Francis River.

The stream is impounded as Deer Run Lake on the border between St. Francois and Madison counties just upstream from its confluence and about two miles north of Mine La Motte.

Rock Creek was so named on account of large rocks on its course.

See also
List of rivers of Missouri

References

Rivers of Madison County, Missouri
Rivers of St. Francois County, Missouri
Rivers of Missouri